Daniel Philimon (born 25 May 1995) is a Vanuatuan sprinter. He competed in the 100 metres event at the 2013 World Championships in Athletics.

References

1995 births
Living people
Vanuatuan male sprinters
Place of birth missing (living people)
World Athletics Championships athletes for Vanuatu